Emiliano Daniel Velázquez Maldonado (born 30 April 1994) is an Uruguayan professional footballer who plays as a central defender for Mexican club Juárez.

Club career

Danubio
Born in Montevideo, Velázquez graduated from local Danubio F.C.'s youth system, and made his first-team debut on 3 June 2012, starting and being sent off in a 2–1 away loss against C.A. Bella Vista. It was his maiden appearance of the campaign.

Velázquez appeared regularly in the 2012–13 season, appearing in 24 matches (all starts, 2106 minutes of action), as his side finished dead last in Apertura but was fifth in Clausura. On 31 August 2013, he scored his first professional goal, netting the last of a 2–1 away win against Liverpool F.C. Montevideo; he was an ever-present figure during the club's winning campaign.

Atlético Madrid
On 27 August 2014, Velázquez signed a five-year deal with Atlético Madrid, and the following day he was loaned to Getafe CF for the 2014–15 season. He made his La Liga debut on 28 September, starting in a 1–0 home win against Málaga CF.

Velázquez scored his first goal in the main category of Spanish football on 21 December, netting the last in a 1–1 draw at Granada CF. After contributing with 27 appearances and avoiding relegation, his loan was extended for another year on 2 July 2015.

After an unassuming loan spell at Primeira Liga side S.C. Braga, Velázquez returned to Getafe on 26 July 2017, also in a one-year loan deal. On 24 August, however, he joined Segunda División club Rayo Vallecano on a season-long loan from the latter.

Rayo Vallecano
After contributing with two goals in 25 appearances as Rayo achieved promotion to the top tier as champions, Velázquez signed a three-year contract with the club on 23 July 2018. He would be mainly used as a backup to Jordi Amat and Abdoulaye Ba during the 2018–19 season, as the Franjirrojos were immediately relegated back.

In July 2019, Velázquez suffered a serious knee injury which sidelined him for the most of the campaign. He returned to action nearly a year later, and subsequently became a regular starter under Andoni Iraola as the club achieved another promotion in 2021.

Santos

On 30 August 2021, Velázquez signed a contract with Brazilian club Santos until the end of 2022. He made his club debut on 18 September, starting in a 0–0 away draw against Ceará.

On 5 July 2022, Velázquez terminated his contract with Santos.

Juárez
On 12 July 2022, Velázquez switched teams and countries again, after signing for Liga MX side Juárez.

International career
Velázquez appeared with Uruguay under-17's in the 2011 FIFA U-17 World Cup, being also his side's captain. He also played for the under-20's in 2013 FIFA U-20 World Cup hosted in Turkey.

On 8 September 2013, Velázquez was called up to the main squad by manager Óscar Tabárez for a friendly against Colombia. He only made his full international debut on 10 October of the following year, starting in a 1–1 draw against Saudi Arabia at the Prince Abdullah Al Faisal Stadium in Jeddah.

Personal life
Velázquez's older brother Matías is also a footballer. A right back, he also represented Danubio.

In September 2020, Velázquez acquired the Spanish nationality after six years living in the country.

Career statistics

Club

International

Honours
Rayo Vallecano
Segunda División: 2017–18

References

External links

1994 births
Living people
People from Montevideo
Uruguayan footballers
Association football defenders
Uruguayan Primera División players
La Liga players
Danubio F.C. players
Atlético Madrid footballers
Getafe CF footballers
Rayo Vallecano players
Primeira Liga players
S.C. Braga players
Campeonato Brasileiro Série A players
Santos FC players
FC Juárez footballers
Uruguay youth international footballers
Uruguay under-20 international footballers
Uruguay international footballers
Uruguayan expatriate footballers
Uruguayan expatriate sportspeople in Spain
Uruguayan expatriate sportspeople in Portugal
Uruguayan expatriate sportspeople in Brazil
Uruguayan expatriate sportspeople in Mexico
Expatriate footballers in Spain
Expatriate footballers in Portugal
Expatriate footballers in Brazil
Expatriate footballers in Mexico